Dicuilus (or the more vernacular version of the name Dícuil) was a monk and geographer, born during the second half of the 8th century. Noble and Evans identify him as a Gael and suggest that he had probably spent time in the Hebrides.

Background
The exact dates of Dicuil's birth and death are unknown. Of his life nothing is known except that he probably belonged to one of the numerous Irish monasteries of the Frankish Kingdom, and became acquainted by personal observation with islands near England and Scotland. From 814 and 816 Dicuil taught in one of the schools of Louis the Pious, where he wrote an astronomical work, and in 825 a geographical work.

Dicuil's reading was wide; he quotes from, or refers to, thirty Greek and Latin writers, including the classical Homer, Hecataeus, Herodotus, Thucydides, Virgil, Pliny and King Juba, the late classical Solinus, the patristic St Isidore and Orosius, and his contemporary the Irish poet Sedulius. In particular, he professes to utilize the alleged surveys of the Roman world executed by order of Julius Caesar, Augustus and Theodosius II.

Based on similarities of style, it has been suggested that Dicuil may be the same person as the anonymous Hiberno-Latin poet and grammarian known as Hibernicus exul.

Astronomical computus
The astronomical work is a sort of computus of five books, in prose and verse. Four books are  preserved in a manuscript which belonged formerly to the monastery of Saint-Amand in northern France, and is now at Valenciennes. A second manuscript is from the abbey of Saint Martin at Tours, and contains two chapters added to the fourth book, and two more chapters constituting a fifth book 

Book 1 contains material on calendars, on 19 year lunar cycles, and on versification. It also contains an account of the two methods of calculating triangular numbers: by summation of the natural  numbers, or by the multiplication together of two consecutive numbers divided by two 

Book 2 contains material on the distance between the earth and the heavens, and between the seven planets; methods for counting the lunar months; the monthly age of the moon; rules for calculating Easter and Lent; intercalary days (extra days) and subtracted days; solar and lunar years; more on versification.

Book 3 contains material on cycles of the stars; 19 year lunar cycles; other large cycles of the sun and moon; the first day of the natural year (the spring equinox in March).

Book 4 contains material on solar intercalary days and lunar subtracted days; and on the relative speed of travel of the moon, sun and stars.

De mensura Orbis terrae
Better known is the De mensura Orbis terrae, a summary of geography, giving concise information about various lands. This work was based upon a Mensuratio orbis prepared by order of Emperor Theodosius II (AD 435), a manuscript copy of which was possessed by the Carolingian court. Godescalc had already made use of this copy (781-783) for the composition of his celebrated Evangelistarium. Dicuil uses Pliny the Elder, Gaius Julius Solinus, Paulus Orosius, Isidore of Seville, and other authors, and adds the results of his own investigations.

In the nine sections he treats successively of Europe, Asia, Africa, Egypt, and Ethiopia, the area of the Earth's surface, the five great rivers, certain islands, the length and breadth of the Tyrrhenian Sea, and the six (highest) mountains.

Although mainly a compilation, this work is not without value. Dicuil is our only source for detailed information of the surveys performed by order of Theodosius II; his quotations, generally exact, are of service for the textual criticism of the authors mentioned; of great interest, too, are the few reports which he got from the travellers of his time; as, for instance, from the monk Fidelis who (possibly in 762 CE) journeyed along the canal then still existing, between the River Nile and the Red Sea; and from clerics who had visited the Faroe Islands and lived possibly in Iceland for six months during the summer of 795. Among their claims are the perpetual day at midsummer in "Thule," where there was then "no darkness to hinder one from doing what one would." They also described navigating the sea north of Iceland on their first arrival, and found it ice-free for one day's sail.

Editions
The geography manuscript was known to Marcus Welser, Isaac Vossius, Claudius Salmasius, Jean Hardouin, and Johann Daniel Schöpflin; it was first printed with the title: Dicuili Liber de mensura orbis terrae ex duobus codd. mss. bibliothecae imperialis nunc primum in lucem editus a Car. Athan. Walckenaer (Paris, 1807).

J. J. Tierney, Dicuil: Liber de Mensura Orbis Terrae, (Dublin 1967).

Notes

References

Irish Christian monks
Irish explorers
9th-century Irish poets
8th-century Irish writers
9th-century Irish writers
9th-century Latin writers
Irish astronomers
Irish expatriates in France
Irish male poets
Irish Latinists
Carolingian poets
9th-century astronomers
Irish scholars and academics